David C. Berliner is an educational psychologist. He was professor and dean of the Mary Lou Fulton Institute and Graduate School of Education.

Biography
After a B.A. in psychology from U.C.L.A. and an M.A. in psychology from California State University at Los Angeles, Berliner received a Ph.D. in Educational Psychology from the Stanford Graduate School of Education. He also was awarded Doctorates of Humane Letters, Honoris Causa, from the University of Massachusetts Amherst and from Manhattanville College. He is the father of BethAnn Berliner, a senior researcher at WestEd and also the father of Brett A. Berliner, a professor of History at Morgan State University and author of Ambivalent Desire: The Exotic Black Other in Jazz Age France.

Berliner has authored more than 400 articles, books and chapters in the fields of educational psychology, teacher education, and educational policy, including the best-seller The Manufactured Crisis (co-authored with B.J. Biddle) and six editions of the textbook Educational Psychology (co-authored with N.L. Gage). He also co-authored Putting Research to Work in your School with his wife, Ursula Casanova, Collateral Damage: How High-stakes Testing Corrupts American Education with S.L. Nichols, and edited the Handbook of Educational Psychology (with R.C. Calfee), Perspectives on instructional Time (with C. Fisher).

Berliner is a past president of the American Educational Research Association, and of the Division of Educational Psychology of the American Psychological Association. Berliner is a Regents' Professor Emeritus of Education at Arizona State University. Among other honors he is an elected member of the National Academy of Education, the International Academy of Education, and a fellow (1988) of the Center for Advanced Study in the Behavioral Sciences. He is the winner of the E.L. Thorndike award in educational psychology, the distinguished contributions award of the American Educational Research Association, the Outstanding Public Communication of Education Research Award (American Educational Research Association, 2016), the Friend of Education award of the NEA, and the Brock International Prize for Distinguished contributions to education.

References

Educational psychologists
Living people
Stanford Graduate School of Education alumni
Year of birth missing (living people)